The statue of Alfredo Toxqui Fernández de Lara in Cholula, Puebla, was erected by Gobierno Municipal de Cholula de Rivadavia in 2004.

References

External links

 

2004 establishments in Mexico
2004 sculptures
Monuments and memorials in Puebla
Outdoor sculptures in Cholula, Puebla
Sculptures of men in Mexico
Statues in Puebla